Anisotremus is a genus of grunts native to the eastern Pacific and western Atlantic Oceans. The name of this genus is compound of anisto meaning “different” and tremus meaning “hole”, referring to the different sized paired pores on each side of the head.

Species
The currently recognized species in this genus are:
Anisotremus caesius (D. S. Jordan & C. H. Gilbert, 1882) (silvergrey grunt)
Anisotremus davidsonii (Steindachner, 1876) (xantic sargo)
Anisotremus dovii (Günther, 1864) (spotted head sargo)
Anisotremus espinozai Acevedo-Álvarez, Ruiz-Campos & Domínguez-Domínguez 2021 (Santa Cruz grunt)
Anisotremus interruptus (T. N. Gill, 1862) (burrito grunt)
Anisotremus moricandi (Ranzani, 1842) (brownstriped grunt)
Anisotremus pacifici (Günther, 1864) (Carruco sargo)
Anisotremus perezponcedeleoni Acevedo-Álvarez, Ruiz-Campos & Domínguez-Domínguez 2021 (Clarion grunt)
Anisotremus scapularis (Tschudi, 1846) (Peruvian grunt)
Anisotremus surinamensis (Bloch, 1791) (black margate)
Anisotremus taeniatus T. N. Gill, 1861 (Panama porkfish)
Anisotremus virginicus (Linnaeus, 1758) (porkfish)

References

 
Haemulinae
Ray-finned fish genera
Taxa named by Theodore Gill
Taxonomy articles created by Polbot